Zdzisław Skrok (born 1950) is a Polish archaeologist and writer. He has published over twenty collections of essays on history (especially of Slavs and Vikings), archaeology, marine exploration and material culture. He is known for his theory of a Viking ancestry of Mieszko I, the first historical sovereign of Poland.He was one of the consultants being interviewed in the five-episode documentary film "The Vikings" by Paul Russell and Andrea Vogt (production: Millstream Films 2015, distribution: Viasat History).

Books

 Na tropach archeologicznych tajemnic Mazowsza (1980) 
 Archeologia mórz (1982) 
 Rodowód z głębi ziemi (1984) 
 W poszukiwaniu Eldorado i Ziemi Obiecanej (1985) 
 Wyjście z kamiennego świata (1988) 
 Wykopaliska na pograniczu światów (1988) 
 Badania archeologiczne Pracowni Konserwacji Zabytków (1988) 
 Sezam starożytności (1989) 
 Odkrywcy oceanów (1990)  
 Archeologia podwodna (1991) 
 Skarby i skorupy (1992) 
 Świat dawnych piratów (1998) 
 Mazowsze nieznane (1999) 
 Skarby małe i duże''' (2001) 
 Skarby Polski (2002) 
 Słowiańska moc (2006)  
 Podolska legenda (2007) 
 Wielkie rozdroże (2008) 
 Mądrość prawieków (2009) 
 Wymowność rzeczy (2012) 
 Czy Wikingowie stworzyli Polskę? (2013) 

In 1995, Skrok also translated Richard Leakey's The Origin of Humankind into Polish. (Pochodzenie człowieka'')

External links
Interviews
  Interview on Iskry editions' YouTube channel, 2012
  Interview at the Polish Writers' Association, 2013
 Teleexpress interview on "Wymowność rzeczy", 2013

20th-century Polish archaeologists
Polish male writers
University of Warsaw alumni
1950 births
Living people
21st-century Polish archaeologists